Hwang Eun-ju (born 22 June 1987) is a South Korean freestyle wrestler. She won one of the bronze medals in the women's freestyle 75 kg event at the 2014 Asian Games held in Incheon, South Korea.

Career 

In 2015, she competed in the women's freestyle 75 kg event at the World Wrestling Championships held in Las Vegas, United States. The following year, she competed at both the first World Wrestling Olympic Qualification Tournament and second World Wrestling Olympic Qualification Tournament hoping to qualify for the 2016 Summer Olympics in Rio de Janeiro, Brazil. In both competitions she was eliminated in her first match.

In 2019, she won one of the bronze medals in the women's 76 kg event at the Asian Wrestling Championships held in Xi'an, China. In the same year, she also competed in the women's freestyle 76 kg at the 2019 World Wrestling Championships held in Nur-Sultan, Kazakhstan. She was eliminated in her first match by Sabira Aliyeva of Azerbaijan.

Major results

References

External links 
 

Living people
1987 births
Place of birth missing (living people)
South Korean female sport wrestlers
Asian Games medalists in wrestling
Asian Games bronze medalists for South Korea
Medalists at the 2014 Asian Games
Wrestlers at the 2014 Asian Games
Wrestlers at the 2018 Asian Games
20th-century South Korean women
21st-century South Korean women